Western Sydney Football Club may refer to:

 Western Sydney Wanderers FC, Australian professional soccer club
 Greater Western Sydney Giants, Australian rules football team